Shaynna Blaze (born April 1965) is an Australian interior designer, television personality, writer and former singer. She is best known for her work as a co-host on Selling Houses Australia (2008–2020) and a judge on The Block (2012–present). In 2021 she won Celebrity Apprentice Australia.

Early life
Born in Melbourne, Australia, Blaze credits her parents, Basil and Annette, as her inspiration. Blaze became interested in interior design as a teenager, and earned a degree in design after completing high school and went straight into designing commercial interiors at Reece Plumbing.

She married her first husband, and they had two children. Following her divorce, she found it "hard to run a business as a single mum" and worked as a jazz singer for 10 years, singing in clubs while her parents babysat. Blaze returned to interior design after remarrying.

Career

Television career
Blaze was working for herself and taking on residential design projects, until a 2007 advertisement in a design newsletter caught her eye. That ad led to her filming an audition tape which then led to her becoming a co-host on Selling Houses Australia, alongside real estate expert Andrew Winter and landscape designer Charlie Albone in 2008.

In 2012, she was hired as a judge on Channel 9's highly successful team renovation show, The Block. Blaze is a much loved part of the series after filming over eleven seasons so far.

She filmed a pilot episode for her own interior design series, Blank Canvas with Shaynna Blaze, which aired on The LifeStyle Channel in April 2013. In 2013 and 2014, Blaze won the ASTRA Award for Favourite Personality – Female, and she co-hosted the 2014 ceremony with Matt Shirvington.

Buying Blind was a one-season show that aired in 2018 in which Blaze and two other experts purchase houses for couples who have signed over their life savings and given a list of requirements for their dream home.

In March 2021, Blaze announced she would also be leaving Selling Houses Australia due to a busy schedule.

Blaze competed in the fifth season of The Celebrity Apprentice Australia in 2021 and succeeded as the winner. On the show Blaze helped to raise over $300k for her charity of choice, Voice of Change which supports survivors of family violence. Blaze stated that this cause means a lot to her as at one point in her life she didn't have the tools to know how to communicate a previous experience and felt unnecessary shame for what she went through.

Publications
In March 2013, Blaze released Design Your Home, an interior design book published by Penguin Books Australia. Her second book, Design with Colour and Style, was released on 25 March 2015.

Blaze occasionally pens design columns for the likes of Stellar Magazine, The Herald Sun and Grand Designs Magazine.

Special media
On 7 and 14 December 2015, a two-part TV special, Shaynna's World of Design, aired on LifeStyle Home. It saw Blaze create a range of interior lighting and travel the globe to gather design inspiration from each place she visited. She also shared her own ideas and design principles along the way, not just for interior lighting, but for everything in the home. In 2016, she hosted Deadline Design on LifeStyle Home.

Business career
Founded in 2005, Blank Canvas Interiors is Blaze's interior design company which is based in Hawthorn East, Victoria. Her approach to design is "functionality of the layout is number one, then I look at the quality and suitability of the fixtures and surfaces, then the colours and styling at the end. A bad design is bad design, no matter how pretty it is". Blaze is known for her ability to quickly and creatively know what could be changed in a floorplan, light and colour to improve a space.

Blaze is a brand ambassador for the Attic Group, Granite Transformations, and Taubmans paint.

With her eye for style, Blaze has designed beautiful products for brands including Molmic, Urban Road, Harris Scarfe and One World Lighting.

Personal life
Blaze's father, Basil, a fitter and turner, died of a heart attack in 1998. After her mother died of Alzheimers in 2016, Blaze was approached by an aged care developer to design a facility. Blaze jumped at the chance to use her personal knowledge and pain to make something beautiful for other families experiencing the disease.

Blaze has a son, Jess Kenneally, and daughter, Carly Anne Kenneally, from her first marriage. She later married personal trainer Steve Vaughan, and was credited by her married name, Shaynna Blaze-Vaughan, in early seasons of Selling Houses Australia. After 18 years of marriage she separated from Vaughan in August 2018.

Blaze once dreamed of being an air hostess, but at only 5 foot 3 inches (160 cm) tall, she was too short.

Yoga, meditation, sketching, painting, reading and walking her pet border collie are some of Blaze's favourite ways to keep her mind focused and clear.

Blaze is a passionate advocate for women, and a social justice campaigner who has leant her voice to a number of organisations tackling domestic violence in Australia. Blaze has MCd candlelight vigils for women and children lost to family violence and presented keynotes at International Women's Day events.

With her children Carly and Jess as writers and co-directors, Blaze was the executive producer of The Fort, a 2021 feature film about one woman's battle to escape her abusive marriage while attempting to shelter her son from the realities of domestic violence.

Filmography

Television

Awards and nominations

References

External links
 
 
 

AACTA Award winners
Australian interior designers
Australian television personalities
Women television personalities
Australian writers
Living people
1963 births
The Apprentice Australia candidates
The Apprentice (franchise) winners